The 2020 Vissel Kobe season was Vissel Kobe's seventh consecutive season in the J1 League following promotion to the top flight in 2013 and their 22nd J1 League season overall. The club also took part in the J. League Cup, the 2020 Japanese Super Cup, and the 2020 AFC Champions League. The club secured their first ever appearances in the latter two competition as winners of the 2019 Emperor's Cup.

Squad

Out on loan

Competitions

J. League

Table

Results summary

Results by matchday

Matches

J.League Cup

Japanese Super Cup

AFC Champions League

Group stage

Matches

Knockout stage

Statistics

Goal scorers

Clean sheets

Notes

References

External links
 Vissel Kobe Official Web Site
 J.League official site

Vissel Kobe
Vissel Kobe seasons